Camila Canabal Sapelli (born November 8, 1976 in Montevideo, Uruguay) is a Venezuelan TV hostess currently living in Miami.

Personal life 

Camila and her family moved to Venezuela when she was a few months old. She grew up in Barquisimeto. She studied English in Minneapolis (USA).

Career 

Her first TV appearance was on October 7, 1997 on a local TV station, but her career took off and at the age of 22, when she was hired by major open TV station RCTV to host several shows. She hosted the show Vida Mamá transmitted by MGM Networks MGM Networks Casa Club TV.

Camila is currently a Youtube personality and fashion entrepreneur with a bag collection with her name “Camila Canabal” and a retail and online store located in Key Biscayne, Florida, called Camila Canabal Shop.

References 

https://camilacanabalshop.com/
https://web.archive.org/web/20070203144632/http://clientes.folletoweb.com/camila/historia1.html
 List of Venezuelans

1976 births
Living people
People from Barquisimeto
Venezuelan television presenters
Venezuelan women television presenters
RCTV personalities